Kändisdjungeln (English: The Celebrity Jungle) was the first and only season of the Swedish version of I'm a Celebrity...Get Me Out of Here!. The first of the 16 episodes was broadcast on 11 September 2009. The show's hosts were David Hellenius and Tilde de Paula. The celebrities were sent to the Malaysian jungle for the show's run. Sweden was the first Scandinavian country to broadcast its own version of the format.

Celebrities
The contestants participating in the show were:

Reception
Björn Borg's wife Patricia Östfeldt-Borg withdrew from participating in the show prior to its launch, and the final list of celebrities was described in Aftonbladet by one critic as unimpressive. In terms of viewership the show was a flop, as whilst the first episode received viewership of 1.2 million, by the middle of the series viewership had already fallen  to 322,000. 62% of the readers of the newspaper Expressen voted the premiere of the show a "disaster".

Notes

 Camp leader Bengt was forced to quit on medical grounds.

References

External links 
 

I'm a Celebrity...Get Me Out of Here!
TV4 (Sweden) original programming
2000s Swedish television series
2009 Swedish television series debuts
2009 Swedish television series endings